Järlepa Lake is a lake in Rapla Parish, Rapla County, Estonia.

The area of the lake is 45.4 ha and its maximum depth is 3.3 m.

The lake belongs to Mahtra Nature Reserve.

References

Rapla Parish
Rapla County
Lakes of Estonia